Richard L. Daft (born 1941) is an American organizational theorist and the Brownlee O. Currey, Jr. Professor of Management at the Owen Graduate School of Management, Vanderbilt University.

Biography
Daft holds a B.S. from the University of Nebraska, an M.B.A. from the University of Chicago, and a Ph.D. from the University of Chicago.

He has made fundamental contributions to the study of organization behavior and organization design, and authored several books in these areas. He co-developed media richness theory, with Robert H. Lengel, and is one of the most widely cited scholars in the field of management.

He developed and managed the Center for Change Leadership at the Owen Graduate School of Management, Vanderbilt University, where he also served as Associate Dean for Academic Programs. He is a Fellow of the Academy of Management.

Bibliography
Leadership (2011)
Leadership and Management (2010)
The Executive and the elephant (2010)
Management: The New Workplace (2009)
Principles of Management (2009)
Understanding the Theory and Design of Organizations (2007)
The Leadership Experience (2006)
Organizational Behaviors (2001)
Talking about Organization (2000)
Fusion Leadership (1998)
Where Are the Theories for the "New" Organizational Forms? An Editorial Essay (1993)
Management (1988), The Dryden Press

References

External links 

 Richard L. Daft's web site at Vanderbilt University

1941 births
Living people
University of Nebraska–Lincoln alumni
American sociologists
Vanderbilt University faculty
University of Chicago Booth School of Business alumni